HMS M19  was a First World War Royal Navy M15-class monitor.

Design

Intended as a shore bombardment vessel, M19s primary armament was a single 9.2 inch Mk VI gun removed from the  HMS Edgar. In addition to her 9.2-inch gun she also possessed one 12 pounder and one six pound anti-aircraft gun. She was equipped with a four shaft Bolinder two-cylinder semi-diesel engine with 640 horsepower that allowed a top speed of eleven knots. The monitor's crew consisted of sixty nine officers and men.

Construction
HMS M19 ordered in March, 1915, as part of the War Emergency Programme of ship construction. She was laid down at the Sir Raylton Dixon & Co. Ltd shipyard at Govan in March 1915, launched on 4 May 1915, and completed in June 1915.

World War 1
M19 served within the Mediterranean from July 1915 to December 1915. On 4 December 1915, she was badly damaged by a gun explosion.  She did not return to Home Waters, paying off at Mudros in 1919.

Disposal
M19 was sold on 12 May 1920 for mercantile service as an oil tanker and renamed 'Delapan'.

References

Dittmar, F. J. & Colledge, J. J., "British Warships 1914–1919", (Ian Allan, London, 1972), 

 

M15-class monitors
1915 ships
World War I monitors of the United Kingdom
Royal Navy ship names